Suraj Pal Chauhan was a Dalit writer and publisher.  He was born on 20 April, 1955 in a village in district Aligarh, Uttar Pradesh. His story, "Harry Kab Ayega" (Short Stories) 1999 is a well known work in Dalit literature.

 He is a recipient of the Hindi Academy Award.

He took his last breath on 15 Jun, 2021.

References

1955 births
2021 deaths
Dalit writers

7. https://www.lokmatnews.in/india/famous-writer-surajpal-chouhan-passed-away-literary-lovers-post-on-social-media-b545/